Metcalfe Street may refer to:
 Metcalfe Street (Ottawa)
 Metcalfe Street (Montreal)

See also
 Metcalfe (disambiguation)